Arturo José Alberto Puig (born 17 November 1944) is an Argentine actor. He has worked in the 1990s success Grande, pá!!!

Biography
Arturo Puig became famous as the lead actor of 1970s telenovelas, such as "Me llaman gorrión" (1972) and "Pablo en nuestra piel" (1977).

He was the lead actor of Grande, pá!, a big success in Argentine television during the 1990s. The TV channel Telefe proposed him to make a remake, but he refused, as the channel did not want to hire the full cast of the original series as Puig proposed.

In the 2000s he has worked sporadically in TV, becoming instead a notable theater actor. He worked in plays such as "El Precio", "Cristales rotos" and "Panorama desde el puente", by Arthur Miller, "¿Quién le teme a Virginia Woolf?" by Edward Albee, and "La vuelta al hogar" by Harold Pinter. In "Rompiendo códigos" he played the British mathematician Alan Turing.

As of 2013, he plays the gay parent of the main character of the Solamente Vos comedy telenovela. He mentioned that he is satisfied that modern television does not use self-censorship on such topics anymore. This is not the first time that Puig played a gay character: besides the play on Alan Turing, he had played another one in Botines, but not under a comedic tone. He also worked in the successful film Tesis sobre un homicidio. Thanks to Gustavo Yankelevich, he worked as a theater director for the first time, in the play Le Prénom, with actors Germán Palacios, Jorgelina Aruzzi, Mercedes Funes, Carlos Belloso and Peto Menahem.

Works

Cinema
 Los Muchachos de mi barrio (1970)
 El Veraneo de los Campanelli (1971)
 He nacido en la ribera (1972)
 Me gusta esa chica (1973)
 El Amor infiel (1974)
 Carmiña: Su historia de amor (1975)
 Los Días que me diste (1975)
 La Hora de María y el pájaro de oro (1975)
 Un Idilio de estación (1978)
 La Conquista del paraíso (1981)
 Contar hasta diez (1985)
 Prontuario de un argentino (1987)
 Kindergarten (1989)
 La Frontera olvidada (1996)
 Lugares comunes (2002)
 Los Marziano (2011)
 Tesis sobre un homicidio (2013)

Television
 Ella, la gata (1968)
 Nino, las cosas simples de la vida (1971)
 Así en la villa como en el cielo (1971)
 Carmiña (1972)
 Pablo en nuestra piel (1977)
 El Tema es el amor (1977)
 Vos y yo, toda la vida (1978)
 Chau, amor mío (1979)
 Ceremonia secreta (1981)
 Barracas al sur (1981)
 Cuando vuelvas a mí (1986)
 Mujer comprada (1986)
 Vínculos (1987)
 Atreverse (1990)
 Grande Pá! (1991)
 Destinos (1992)
 El Rafa (1997)
 Primicias (2000)
 El Precio del poder (2002)
 Dr. Amor (2003)
 Hombres de honor (2005)
 Botines (2005)
 Solamente vos (2013)

Theatre
 Cartas de Amor (2004)
 Panorama desde el puente (2004)
 ¿Quién le teme a Virginia Woolf? (2007)
 El precio (2011)

Award Nominations
 2013 Martín Fierro Awards
 Best secondary actor (for Solamente Vos)

References

External links
 
 Arturo Puig at cinenacional.com 

Argentine male actors
People from Buenos Aires
1944 births
Living people